Madison High School is a fully accredited public high school located in Madison, Kansas, United States, and services students in grades 7 to 12.  It is operated by Madison-Virgil USD 386 school district.  The principal is Stu Moeckel. The school mascot is the Bulldogs and the school colors are black and gold.

Extracurricular activities
The Bulldogs compete in the Lyon County League. The KSHSAA classification is 2A, the second lowest class. The school also has a variety of organizations for the students to participate in.

Athletics
The Bulldogs compete in the Lyon County League and are classified as 2A the second lowest classification in Kansas according to KSHSAA. Madison combines sports with Hamilton High School. A majority of the sports are coached by the same coaches. Madison High School offers the following sports:

 Fall Sports
 Cheerleading
 Football
 Volleyball
 Cross Country

 Winter
 Boys' Basketball
 Girls' Basketball
 Cheerleading

 Spring
 Boys' Track and Field
 Girls' Track and Field

Organizations
 Agriculture Program
 Band
 National Honor Society (NHS)
 Scholars Bowl
 Student Council (StuCo)
 Yearbook

See also
 List of high schools in Kansas
 List of unified school districts in Kansas

References

External links
 
 District Website
 USD 386 School District Boundary Map, KDOT

Public high schools in Kansas
Public middle schools in Kansas
Greenwood County, Kansas